Facundo Agüero (born 21 January 1995) is an Argentine professional footballer who plays as a centre-back for Unión de Santa Fe.

Career
Agüero had a period in the youth of Sportivo Independiente, which preceded his move to Instituto. His first club at senior level became Instituto in 2015. Atlético Paraná were the opponents for Agüero's professional debut on 4 April 2015, with the defender playing the entirety of a 2–0 loss. After making twenty-eight appearances for them, his first goal arrived in September 2016 against Estudiantes at the Estadio Presidente Perón.

Personal life
Agüero's father, Roque, was also a professional footballer; for clubs such as Boca Juniors and Sarmiento.

Career statistics
.

References

External links

1995 births
Living people
Argentine footballers
Argentine expatriate footballers
People from General Pico
Association football defenders
Primera Nacional players
Chilean Primera División players
Instituto footballers
Deportes La Serena footballers
Unión de Santa Fe footballers
Argentine expatriate sportspeople in Chile
Expatriate footballers in Chile